The 1999–2000 Nemzeti Bajnokság I, also known as NB I, was the 98th season of top-tier football in Hungary. The league was officially named Professzionális Nemzeti Bajnokság (PNB) for sponsorship reasons. The season started on 7 August 1999 and ended on 27 May 2000.

Overview
It was contested by 18 teams, and Dunaferr FC won the championship.

League standings

Results

Statistical leaders

Top goalscorers

References
Hungary - List of final tables (RSSSF)

Nemzeti Bajnokság I seasons
1999–2000 in Hungarian football
Hungary